The Scout and Guide movement in Guinea is served by two organisations 
 Association Nationale des Guides de Guinée, member of the World Association of Girl Guides and Girl Scouts
 Association Nationale des Scouts de Guinée, member of the World Organization of the Scout Movement

See also